Aberystwyth University is a public research university in Aberystwyth, Wales. Aberystwyth was a founding member institution of the former federal University of Wales. The university has over 8,000 students studying across three academic faculties and 17 departments.

Founded in 1872 as University College Wales, Aberystwyth, it became a founder member of the University of Wales in 1894, and changed its name to the University College of Wales, Aberystwyth. In the mid-1990s, the university again changed its name to become the University of Wales, Aberystwyth. On 1 September 2007, the University of Wales ceased to be a federal university and Aberystwyth University became independent again. The annual income of the institution for 2021–22 was £119.9 million of which £17.4 million was from research grants and contracts, with an expenditure of £147.1 million.

In 2019, it became the first university to be named "University of the year for teaching quality" by The Times/Sunday Times Good University Guide for two consecutive years. It is the first university in the world to be awarded Plastic Free University status (for single-use plastic items).

History 

In the middle of the 19th century, eminent Welsh people were advocating the establishment of a university in the principality. One of these, Thomas Nicholas, whose book, Middle and High Class Schools, and University Education for Wales (1863), is said to have "exerted great influence on educated Welshmen".

Funded through public and private subscriptions, and with five regional committees (London, Manchester, Liverpool, North and South Wales) guaranteeing funds for the first three years' running costs, the university opened in October 1872 with 26 students. Thomas Charles Edwards was the principal. In October 1875, chapels in Wales raised the next tranche of funds from over 70,000 contributors. Until 1893, when the college joined the University of Wales as a founder member, students applying to Aberystwyth sat the University of London's entrance exams. Women were admitted in 1884.

In 1885, a fire damaged what is now known as the Old College, Aberystwyth, and in 1897 the first 14 acres of what became the main Penglais campus were purchased. Incorporated by Royal Charter in 1893, the university installed the Prince of Wales as chancellor in 1896, the same year it awarded an honorary degree to the British prime minister, William Gladstone.

The university's coat of arms dates from the 1880s. The shield features two red dragons to symbolise Wales, and an open book to symbolise learning. The crest, an eagle or phoenix above a flaming tower, may signify the college's rebirth after the 1885 fire.

In the early 1900s, the university added courses that included law, applied mathematics, pure mathematics and botany. The Department for International Politics, which Aberystwyth says is the oldest such department in the world, was founded in 1919. By 1977, the university's staff included eight Fellows of the Royal Society, such as Gwendolen Rees, the first Welsh woman to be elected an FRS.

The Department of Sports and Exercise Science was established in 2000. Joint honours psychology degrees were introduced in September 2007, and single honours psychology in 2009.

The chancellor of the university is The Lord Thomas of Cwmgiedd, who took up the position in January 2018. The visitor of the university is an appointment made by the Privy Council, under the Royal Charter of the university. Since July 2014, the holder of this office is Mr Justice Sir Roderick Evans KC.

In 2011, the university appointed a new vice chancellor under whom the academic departments were restructured as larger subject-themed institutes.

In 2022, the university celebrated its 150th anniversary, being established in 1872 (known at the time as The University College of Wales).

Organisation and administration

Departments and Faculties
The university's academic departments, as well as the Arts Centre, International English Centre and Music Centre are organised in three faculties:

 Faculty of Arts and Social Sciences
 School of Art
 Arts Centre
 School of Education
 Department of English and Creative Writing
 Department of History and Welsh History
 International English Centre
 Department of International Politics
 Department of Law and Criminology
 Department of Modern Languages
 Music Centre
 Department of Theatre, Film and Television Studies
 Department of Welsh and Celtic Studies

 Faculty of Business and Physical Sciences
 Aberystwyth Business School
 Department of Computer Science
 Department of Information Studies
 Department of Mathematics
 Department of Physics

 Faculty of Earth and Life Sciences
 Institute of Biological, Environmental and Rural Sciences
 Department of Geography and Earth Sciences
 Department of Psychology

Institute of Biological, Environmental and Rural Sciences
The Institute of Biological, Environmental and Rural Sciences (IBERS) is a research and teaching centre which brings together staff from the Institutes of Rural Sciences and Biological Sciences and the Institute of Grassland and Environmental Research (IGER). Around 360 research, teaching and support staff conduct basic, strategic and applied research in biology.

The institute is located in two areas; one at the main teaching Penglais campus and another rural research hub at the Gogerddan campus.

Aberystwyth Business School
In 1998, the Department of Economics (founded in 1912), the Department of Accounting and Finance (founded in 1979) and the Centre for Business Studies merged to create the School of Management and Business. In 2013, the School joined the Department of Information Studies and the Department of Law and Criminology at a new campus at Llanbadarn Fawr. The school was shortlisted for "Business School of the Year" in the Times Higher Education Awards (2014). In 2016, the institute, minus the Department of Information Studies, was renamed the Institute of Business and Law, the remaining departments being renamed Aberystwyth Business School and Aberystwyth Law School.

Department of Computer Science

The Department of Computer Science (founded in 1970), conducts research in automated reasoning, computational biology, vision graphics and visualisation and intelligent robotics.

AberMUD, the first popular internet-based MUD, was written in the department by then-student Alan Cox. Jan Pinkava, another graduate, won an Oscar for his short animated film Geri's Game. Students in the department were also involved in the creation of the award-winning service robot librarian named Hugh and Kar-go, the autonomous delivery vehicle.

Department of Geography and Earth Sciences
The Department of Geography and Earth Sciences (IGES) was formed, in 1989, from the former Departments of Geography (established in 1918) and Geology. It houses the E. G. Bowen map library, containing 80,000 maps and 500 atlases.

Department of Information Studies

The College of Librarianship Wales (CLW) was established at Llanbadarn Fawr in 1964, in response to a recommendation for the training of bilingual librarians that was made in the Bourdillon Report on Standards of public library service in England (HMSO, 1962). The college grew rapidly, developing close links to the Welsh speaking and professional communities, acquiring an international reputation and pioneering flexible and distance learning courses. It claimed to be Europe's largest institution for training librarians. The independent college merged with the university in August 1989 and the department moved to the Penglais campus a quarter of a century later. Following the merger, the new department took over responsibility for existing offerings in archives administration and modern records management.

Department of International Politics

The Department of International Politics is the oldest of its kind in the world. It was founded, shortly after the First World War in 1919, with the stated purpose of furthering political understanding of the world in the hope of avoiding such conflicts in the future. This goal led to the creation of the Woodrow Wilson Chair of International Politics, with Wilson having played a significant role in its creation. The department has over 700 students from 40 countries studying at undergraduate, masters and PhD levels. It achieved a 95% score for student satisfaction in the 2016 National Student Survey, placing it as the highest-ranking politics department in Wales and within the UK's top ten.

The department has hosted notable academic staff in the field including E. H. Carr, Leopold Kohr, Andrew Linklater, Ken Booth, Steve Smith, Michael Cox, Michael MccGwire, Jenny Edkins and Colin J. McInnes.

Department of Law and Criminology
The Department of Law and Criminology (founded in 1901) is housed in the Hugh Owen Building on the Penglais campus, and includes the Centre for Welsh Legal Affairs, a specialist research centre. All academic staff are engaged in research, and the International Journal of Biosciences and the Law and the Cambrian Law Review are edited in the department. In 2013, the department joined the Department of Information Studies and the School of Management and Business at a new campus at Llanbadarn Fawr, as part of a newly created Institute of Management, Law and Information Studies. In September 2018, the department moved back to the Hugh Owen Building, based in the Penglais campus, and its name changed from Aberystwyth Law School to the Department of Law and Criminology.

The Guardian University Guide 2018 ranked the Law Department at 69th in the UK, and "The Times" Higher Education Guide ranks it as 300th globally.

Department of Modern Languages
Aberystwyth has taught modern languages since 1874. French, German, Italian and Spanish courses are taught at both beginners' and advanced levels, in a research-active academic environment. One of its research projects is the Anglo-Norman Dictionary, based in Aberystwyth since 2001 and available online since 2005.

Department of Physics
Physics was first taught at Aberystwyth as part of Natural Philosophy, Astronomy and Mathematics under N. R. Grimley, soon after the foundation of the University College. It became a department in 1877, under the leadership of F. W. Rudler. The department was located in the south wing of what is now the Old College, but later moved to the Physics Building on the Penglais Campus. The first chair in Physics was offered to D. E. Jones in 1885. Before the First World War, much of the early research in the department was undertaken in Germany. Early research in the 1900s was concerned with electrical conductivity and quantum theory, later moving into thermal conductivity and acoustics. In 1931, the department hosted the Faraday Centenary Exhibition. E. J. Williams was appointed to the Chair of Physics in 1938 where he continued his research into sub-atomic particles using a cloud chamber. Following the Second World War, research was concerned with mechanical and nuclear physics, later moving into the fields of air density, experimental rocket launching equipment and radar.

Department of Psychology
In 2007, Aberystwyth established psychology as a "Centre for Applied Psychology" within the Department of International Politics. By 2011, psychology had moved into its current premises in Penbryn 5 on the Penglais Campus. The department has over 300 undergraduate students, with degrees accredited by the British Psychological Society.

Campuses

Penglais 
The main campus of the university is situated on Penglais Hill, overlooking the town of Aberystwyth and Cardigan Bay, and comprises most of the university buildings, Arts Centre, Students' Union, and many of the student residences. Just below Penglais Campus is the National Library of Wales, one of Britain's five legal deposit libraries. The landscaping of the Penglais Campus is historically significant and is listed at Grade II* on the Cadw/ICOMOS Register of Parks and Gardens of Special Historic Interest in Wales. The CADW listing states,

Llanbadarn 
The Llanbadarn Centre is located approximately one mile to the east of the Penglais Campus, near Llanbadarn Fawr, overlooking the town and Cardigan Bay to the west, with the backdrop of the Cambrian Mountains to the east. Llanbadarn Centre hosted Aberystwyth Law School and Aberystwyth Business School, which together formed the Institute of Business and Law. The Department of Information Studies is also based there. Additionally, the Llanbadarn Campus is the site of the Aberystwyth branch of Coleg Ceredigion (a further education college, and not part of the university).

Goggerddan 
At Gogerddan, on the outskirts of town is located the university's major centre for research in land based sciences and the main centre for the Institute of Biological, Environmental and Rural Science.

School of Art, Edward Davies Building 

The School of Art is located between the Penglais Campus and the centre of Aberystwyth, in what was originally the Edward Davies Chemical Laboratory.  A listed building, the Edward Davies Building is one of the finest examples of architecture in Aberystwyth.

Old College 
The site of the original university is the Old College, currently the subject of the "New Life for Old College" project which aims to transform it into an integrated centre of heritage, culture, learning and knowledge exchange. The university opened an international campus in Mauritius in 2016 operating as Aberystwyth University (Mauritian Branch Campus) and registered with the Tertiary Education Commission of Mauritius, but closed it to new enrolments two years later due to low enrolment numbers.

Student residences
Most of the student residences are on campus, with the rest in walking distance of the campus and Aberystwyth town centre.  Accommodation ranges from "traditional" catered residences to en-suite self-catered accommodation, and from budget rooms to more luxurious studio apartments.  All have wired access to the university's computer network and a support network of residential tutors.

Penglais Campus
Cwrt Mawr (self-catered flats, single rooms, capacity 503)
 (Welsh speaking traditional catered hall, refurbished in 2020, capacity 200)
Penbryn (Welsh-speaking traditional catered hall, capacity 350)
Rosser (self-catered en-suite flats, capacity 336), 
Rosser G (postgraduate flats following 2011 expansion to Rosser, capacity 60)
Trefloyne (self-catered flats, capacity 147)

Pentre Jane Morgan (Student Village)
Almost 200 individual houses arranged in closes and cul-de-sacs. Each house typically accommodates five or six students. The total capacity is 1,003.

Fferm Penglais Student Residence
 Purpose-built student accommodation with studio apartments and en-suite bedrooms (total capacity 1,000). An area of accommodation within the Fferm Penglais Student Residence is set aside for students who are Welsh learners or fluent Welsh speakers and who wish to live in a Welsh speaking environment.

Town accommodation
Seafront Residences (self-catered flats located on the seafront and Queen's Road, overall capacity 361). The original Seafront residences, Plyn' and Caerleon, were destroyed by fire in 1998. 
Seafront residences include Aberglasney, Balmoral, Blaenwern, Caerleon, Carpenter, Pumlumon, Ty Glyndwr, and Ty Gwerin Halls.

The university also owns several houses, such as Penglais Farmhouse (adjacent to Pentre Jane Morgan) and flats in Waun Fawr, which are let on an assured shorthold tenure to students with families. Disabled access rooms are available within the existing student village.

Reputation and academic profile

Aberystwyth University is placed in the UK's top 50 universities in the main national rankings. It is ranked 48th for 132 UK university rankings in The Times/Sunday Times Good University Guide for 2019 and the first university to be given the prestigious award "University of the year for teaching quality" for two consecutive years, in2018 and 2019.

The Times Higher Education World University Rankings placed it in the 301—350 group for 800 university rankings, compared with 351—400 the previous year, and the QS World University Rankings placed it at the 432nd position for 2019, compared with 481—490 of the previous year. In 2015, UK employers from "predominantly business, IT and engineering sectors" listed Aberystwyth equal 49th in their 62-place employability rankings for UK graduates, according to a Times Higher Education report.

Aberystwyth University was rated in the top ten of UK higher education institutions for overall student satisfaction in the 2016 National Student Survey (NSS).

Aberystwyth University was shortlisted in four categories in the Times Higher Education Leadership and Management Awards (THELMAs) (2015).

Aberystwyth University has been awarded the Silver Award under the Corporate Health Standard (CHS), the quality mark for workplace health promotion run by Welsh Government.

The university has been awarded an Athena SWAN Charter Award, recognising commitment to advancing women's careers in science, technology, engineering, maths and medicine (STEMM) in higher education and research.

In 2007, the university came under criticism for its record on sustainability, ranking 97th out of 106 UK higher education institutions in that year's Green League table. In 2012 the university was listed in the table's "Failed, no award" section, ranking equal 132nd out of 145. In 2013 it ranked equal 135th out of 143, and was listed again as "Failed, no award".

Following the university's initiatives to address sustainability, it received an EcoCampus Silver Phase award in October 2014.

In October 2015, the university's Penglais Campus became the first university campus in Wales to achieve the Green Flag Award. The Green Flag Award is a UK-wide partnership, delivered in Wales by Keep Wales Tidy with support from Natural Resources Wales, and is the mark of a high quality park or green space.

In 2013, the University and College Union alleged bullying behaviour by Aberystwyth University managers, and said staff were fearful for their jobs. The university president, Sir Emyr Jones Parry, said in a BBC radio interview, "I don't believe the views set out are representative and I don't recognise the picture." He also said, "Due process is rigorously applied in Aberystwyth." The economist John Cable resigned his emeritus professorship, describing the university's management as "disproportionate, aggressive and confrontational". The singer Peter Karrie resigned his honorary fellowship in protest, he said, at the apparent determination to "ruin one of the finest arts centres in the country", and because he was "unable to support any regime that can treat their staff in such a cruel and appalling manner".

Officers and academics
Presidents and chancellors

1872–95 Henry Austin Bruce, 1st Lord Aberdare
1895–1913 Stuart, Lord Rendel
1913–26 Sir John Williams, 1st Bt
1926–44 Edmund Davies, Lord Edmund-Davies
1944–54 Thomas Jones (T. J.)
1955–64 Sir David Hughes Parry
1964–76 Sir Ben Bowen Thomas
1977–85 Cledwyn Hughes, Lord Cledwyn of Penrhos
1985–97 Melvyn Rosser
1997–2007 Elystan Morgan, Lord Elystan-Morgan
2007–17 Sir Emyr Jones Parry
2018–present John, Lord Thomas of Cwmgiedd

Principals and Vice-Chancellors

1872–91 Thomas Charles Edwards
1891–1919 Thomas Francis Roberts
1919–26 John Humphreys Davies
1927–34 Sir Henry Stuart-Jones
1934–52 Ifor Leslie Evans
1953–57 Goronwy Rees
1958–69 Sir Thomas Parry
1969–79 Sir Goronwy Daniel
1979–89 Gareth Owen
1989–94 Kenneth, Lord Morgan
1994–2004 Derec Llwyd Morgan
2004–11 Noel Lloyd
2011–16 April McMahon
2016–17 John Grattan (acting)
2016–present Elizabeth Treasure

Academics

Henry Bird, Lecturer in Art History (1936–41)
Ken Booth, Professor of International Politics
Mary Brebner, Lecturer in Modern Languages and Latin (1898-1919)
Edward Carr, Historian, Woodrow Wilson Professor of International Politics
Sir Henry Walford Davies, Master of the King's Music
John Davies, Welsh historian
Hannah Dee, Lecturer in Computer Science
R. Geraint Gruffydd, Chair of Welsh Language and Literature (1970–79)
David Russell Hulme, Director of Music (1992–), conductor, musicologist
Robert Maynard Jones, Chair of Welsh Language (1980)
D. Gwenallt Jones, poet, Welsh Lecturer
Leopold Kohr, Economist, Political Scientist
Dennis Lindley, Professor of Statistics (1960–67)
David John de Lloyd, Gregynog Professor of Music, composer
Alec Muffett, Systems Programmer (1988–92)
Charles Musselwhite, Professor of Psychology (2021-)
Lily Newton, Professor of Botany
Ian Parrott, Gregynog Professor of Music (1950–83), composer, musicologist
Joseph Parry, Professor of Music, composer, conductor
Sir Thomas Herbert Parry-Williams, poet, Professor of Welsh (1920–52)
F. Gwendolen Rees FRS Professor of Zoology
Huw Rees FRS (1923–2009), Geneticist
William Rubinstein, Professor of History
Marie Breen Smyth, Reader in Political Violence, International Politics
Howard 'Sid' Thomas, Professor of Botany
Richard Marggraf Turley, Professor of Engagement with the Public Imagination
Dame Marjorie Williamson, Principal, Royal Holloway, London (1962–73)
Richard Henry Yapp, botanist

Alumni

Royalty

Charles III, King of the United Kingdom
Tunku Muhriz Ibni Almarhum Tunku Munawir, 11th Yang Di Pertuan Besar (Grand Ruler) of Negeri Sembilan, Malaysia (2008–present)
Tunku Naquiyuddin, Tunku Laksamana of Negeri Sembilan, Malaysia (Regent: 1994–99)
Ahmad Tejan Kabbah, 3rd President of Sierra Leone (1996–7)

Academia

E. G. Bowen, geographer
Sir Edward Collingwood, mathematician, scientist
Alan Cox, programmer (major contributor to the Linux kernel, 1980s)
D. J. Davies, economist, socialist, Plaid Cymru activist
Natasha Devon, writer, mental health activist
Andrew Gordon naval historian
Sir Deian Hopkin, historian
David Russell Hulme, director of music (from 1992), conductor
Rhiannon Ifans, Welsh and Celtic medieval specialist, author
David Gwilym James vice-chancellor, University of Southampton 1952–65
Emrys Jones, professor of geography, London School of Economics
T. Harri Jones, poet
Roy Kift, dramatist, writer
Mary King, political scientist
Michael MccGwire, international relations specialist, naval commander
Twm Morys, poet
Tavi Murray, glaciologist, Polar Medallist
Ernest Charles Nelson, botanist
David Hughes Parry, vice-chancellor, University of London (1945–48)
T. H. Parry-Williams, poet, author, academic
Frederick Soddy, Nobel Prize Winner in Chemistry (1921)
Vaughan Southgate OBE DL PPFLS FRSM FRSB FZS (born 1944), parasitologist
Sir John Meurig Thomas FRS, chemist, professor, author
Paul Thomas, founding vice-chancellor, University of the Sunshine Coast
Sir Nigel Thrift, geographer, vice chancellor, University of Warwick
David John Williams, writer
Sir Glanmor Williams, historian
John Tudno Williams, theologian
Waldo Williams, poet
William Richard Williams, theologian
Christine James, first female Archdruid of Wales

Law

Salleh Abas, Lord President of the Federal Court, Malaysia (1984–88)
Belinda Ang, judge, Supreme Court of Singapore (2003–)
Sir Alun Talfan Davies, judge, publisher
Sir Ellis Ellis-Griffith, 1st Bt, barrister, Liberal politician
Iris de Freitas Brazao, first female prosecuting lawyer in the Caribbean
Sir Samuel Thomas Evans, barrister, judge, Liberal politician
Elwyn, Lord Elwyn-Jones, lord chancellor (1974–79)
John, Lord Morris of Aberavon, attorney general (1997–99)

Civil servants

Timothy Brain, Chief Constable for Gloucestershire (2001–10)
Sir Goronwy Daniel, civil servant, academic

Politics

Joe Borg, European Union oceans and fisheries commissioner (2004–10)
Roderic Bowen, Liberal MP, Commons deputy speaker
Nicholas, Lord Bourne of Aberystwyth, Welsh Conservative leader (1999–2011)
Rehman Chishti, Conservative MP (2010–), special envoy (2019–20)
David Davies, 1st Baron Davies, Liberal politician, philanthropist
Glyn Davies, Conservative MP
Gwilym Prys Davies, Lord Prys-Davies, Labour peer (1982–2015)
Gwynfor Evans, first Plaid Cymru MP
Steve Gilbert, Liberal Democrat MP (2010–15)
Siân Gwenllian, Plaid Cymru AM
Neil Hamilton, Conservative MP and AM, barrister
Sylvia Hermon, Ulster Unionist politician
Emlyn Hooson, Baron Hooson, Liberal politician
Cledwyn Hughes, Baron Cledwyn of Penrhos, Labour politician
Hishammuddin Hussein, defence minister, Malaysia, (2021–)
Dan Jarvis, Labour MP
Bethan Jenkins, Plaid Cymru AM for South Wales West
Carwyn Jones, First Minister of Wales (2009–18), AM for Bridgend
Gerry MacLochlainn Sinn Féin politician
John Morris, Baron Morris of Aberavon, Labour politician
Elystan Morgan, Baron Elystan-Morgan, Labour MP
Roland Moyle, Labour MP, parliamentary private secretary to Clement Attlee
Will Quince, Conservative MP
Dan Rogerson, Liberal Democrat MP
Liz Saville Roberts, Plaid Cymru MP, and Westminster Leader (2017–)
Molly Scott Cato, Green Party MEP
Ahmed Shaheed, minister for foreign affairs, Maldives
Virginijus Sinkevičius, European Union environment commissioner (2019–)
Bob Stewart, Conservative MP
Gareth Thomas, Labour MP
Gareth Thomas, Labour MP
Mark Williams, Liberal Democrat MP, Welsh LD Leader (2016–17)
Mike Wood, Conservative MP
Steven Woolfe, UK Independence Party MEP

Business

Lance Batchelor, CEO, Domino's Pizza and Saga
Geoff Drabble, CEO, Ashtead
Belinda Earl, CEO, Debenhams and Jaeger
Tom Singh, owner and CEO, New Look

Sports

Cath Bishop, professional rower, civil servant
John Dawes, Rugby player, captain of Wales and British Lions
Carwyn James, Wales and British and Irish Lions Rugby coach (1949?–51)
Leigh Richmond Roose, international footballer
Berwyn Price, gold medal Commonwealth Games (1978)
Angela Tooby, silver medal, World Cross-Country Championships (1988)

Arts and entertainment

Dorothy Bonarjee, Indian poet, artist
Neil Brand, writer, composer, silent film accompanist
Harris Brewis, British video essayist, YouTube personality
 Seth Clabough, American novelist, academic
Shân Cothi, operatic singer, actress
Jane Green, author
Sarah Hall, writer, poet
David Russell Hulme, conductor, musicologist
Aneirin Hughes, actor
Emrys James, actor
Eveline Annie Jenkins (1893–1976), botanical artist 
Alex Jones, presenter, BBC One TV programme, The One Show (2010–)
Melih Kibar, Turkish composer
Alun Lewis, Second World War writer, poet
Caryl Lewis, novelist
Rick Lloyd, musician (Y Blew, Flying Pickets)
Hayley Long, fiction writer
Sharon Maguire, film director, Bridget Jones's Diary
Matt McCooey, actor
Alan Mehdizadeh, actor, Billy Elliot the Musical
Robert Minhinnick, poet, essayist, novelist, translator
Amy Parry-Williams (1910–1988), singer, writer
Esther Pilkington, performance artist
Jan Pinkava, Oscar-winning animated film director
Rachel Roberts, actress
Lisa Surihani, Malaysian actress
Richard Roberts, theologian, pacifist

Journalism
Sir David Nicholas, journalist and ITN chief executive and chairman
Jonathan Moyle, journalist, RAF pilot and alleged MI6 agent.
Gareth Jones, journalist, publicised the Holodomor committed by the USSR against the Ukrainian people.

Gallery

See also

Aberystwyth Arts Centre
Aberystwyth University Students' Union
Armorial of UK universities
List of modern universities in Europe (1801–1945)
List of universities in the United Kingdom
List of universities in Wales
Thomas Parry Library

Further reading
Iwan Morgan (ed.), The College by the Sea (Aberystwyth, 1928)
E.L. Ellis, The University College of Wales, Aberystwyth: 1872–1972, University of Wales Press  (2004)
Ben Bowen Thomas, "Aber" 1872–1972 (University of Wales Press, 1972)
J Roger Webster, Old College Aberystwyth: The Evolution of a High Victorian Building (University of Wales Press, 1995)
Emrys Wynn Jones, Fair may your future be: the story of the Aberystwyth Old Students' Association 1892–1992 (Aberystwyth Old Students' Association, 1992)

References

External links

Aberystwyth University – University official website
Aberystwyth Students' Union – Students' Union website 
Aberystwyth Old Students' Association – Alumni Association website

 
Percy Thomas buildings
Aberystwyth
1872 establishments in Wales
Educational institutions established in 1872
Buildings and structures in Aberystwyth
Universities UK
Registered historic parks and gardens in Ceredigion